Cossypha are small insectivorous birds, with most species called robin-chats. They were formerly in the thrush family Turdidae, but are now more often treated as part of the Old World flycatcher Muscicapidae.

These are African woodland dwelling species, but some have become adapted to sites around human habitation.

The name Cossypha for the genus was introduced by the Irish zoologist Nicholas Aylward Vigors in 1825. The word comes from the Classical Greek kossuphos for a blackbird or thrush.

The genus contains the following species:

 Mountain robin-chat, Cossypha isabellae
 Archer's ground robin, Cossypha archeri
 Olive-flanked ground robin, Cossypha anomala
 Cape robin-chat, Cossypha caffra
 White-throated robin-chat, Cossypha humeralis
 Blue-shouldered robin-chat, Cossypha cyanocampter
 Rüppell's robin-chat, Cossypha semirufa
 White-browed robin-chat, Cossypha heuglini
 Red-capped robin-chat, Cossypha natalensis
 Chorister robin-chat, Cossypha dichroa
 White-headed robin-chat, Cossypha heinrichi
 Snowy-crowned robin-chat, Cossypha niveicapilla
 White-crowned robin-chat, Cossypha albicapilla

References

 
 
Taxa named by Nicholas Aylward Vigors